Perfluorotributylamine (PFTBA), also referred to as FC43, is a colorless liquid with the formula N(C4F9)3.  The compound consists of three butyl groups connected to an amine center, in which all of the hydrogen atoms have been replaced with fluorine. The compound is produced for the electronics industry, along with other perfluoroalkylamines.  The high degree of fluorination significantly reduces the basicity of the central amine due to electron-withdrawing effects.

Preparation
It is prepared by electrofluorination of tributylamine using hydrogen fluoride as solvent and source of fluorine:
N(C4H9)3  +  27 HF   →   N(C4F9)3  +  27 H2

Uses
The compound has two commercial uses.
It is used as an ingredient in Fluosol, artificial blood.  This application exploits the high solubility of oxygen and carbon dioxide in the solvent, as well as the low viscosity and toxicity.  It is also a component of Fluorinert coolant liquids.  CPUs of some computers are immersed in this liquid to facilitate cooling.

Niche
The compound is used as a calibrant in gas chromatography when the analytical technique uses mass spectrometry as a detector to identify and quantify chemical compounds in gases or liquids. When undergoing ionization in the mass spectrometer, the compound decomposes in a repeatable pattern to form fragments of specific masses, which can be used to tune the mass response and accuracy of the mass spectrometer. Most commonly used ions are those with approximate mass of 69, 131, 219, 414 and 502 atomic mass units.

Safety
Fluorofluids are generally of very low toxicity, so much that they have been evaluated as synthetic blood.

Environmental impact
It is a greenhouse gas with warming properties more than 7,000 times that of carbon dioxide over a 100-year period, and, as such, is the most potent greenhouse gas ever discovered.  Its concentration in the atmosphere is approximately 0.18 parts per trillion.  The compound can persist in the atmosphere for up to 500 years. Sulfur hexafluoride, however, has a GWP of 23,900, which would make it much more powerful.

See also
 Perfluorotripentylamine

References

Greenhouse gases
Perfluorinated compounds
Amines
Coolants